Torvill & Dean is a British televisual biopic written by William Ivory, directed by Gillies MacKinnon, and broadcast on ITV on Christmas Day 2018. It is about the early life and careers of Jane Torvill and Christopher Dean, the Nottinghamshire ice dancers who went on to record a perfect score and win the Olympic gold medal in Sarajevo at the 1984 Winter Olympics.

Cast
Will Tudor as Christopher Dean
Poppy Lee Friar as Jayne Torvill
Cassie Bradley as Leanne
Dean Andrews as Colin Dean
Annabelle Apsion as Betty Callaway
Mark Benton as Ted
Christine Bottomley as  Mavis Dean
Anita Dobson as Miss Perry
Susan Earl as Betty Dawson
Jo Hartley as Betty Torvill
Stephen Tompkinson as  George Torvill
Jaime Winstone as Janet Sawbridge
Curtis Lee Ashquar as Darren
Tim Bentinck as Announcer
Joe Docherty as Brian Dawson
Kevwe Emefe as Receptionist
Danielle Hadfield-Easton as Young Jayne
Mason Hart as Young Christopher
Daniel Fitzsimons as Aidy
Niall Lingard as Andrew

Production
British Olympic ice skaters Nick Buckland and Penny Coomes joined the cast as stunt doubles, and acted as consultants. Torvill and Dean were interviewed extensively by Nottinghamshire born writer William Ivory and gave their blessing to the biopic. Cassie Bradley performed her own ice skating for the role of Leanne, having grown up in Nottingham and attended school with friends Buckland and Coomes.

Reception
The film was watched by 7.74 million viewers in the UK.

Lucy Mangan in The Guardian gave the biopic 5 stars praising the ‘perfect adaptation’ and ‘genuinely brilliant’ performances by Will Tudor and Poppy Lee Friar. The Daily Telegraph also praised the ‘perfect nostalgic festive fare’ with ‘broad humour and gentle observation’. The Independent was more critical giving 2 stars and commenting on the ‘schmalz’.

References

Films directed by Gillies MacKinnon
ITV television dramas
2010s British television series
Television shows set in England
English-language television shows
Films shot in Nottinghamshire